Qeshlaq-e Nariman Kandi Hajj Khan Owghlan (also Romanized as Qeshlāq-e Narīmān Kandī Ḩājj Khān Owghlān; also known as Qeshlāq-e Narīmān and Qeshlāq-e Narīmān-e Khān Ūghlān) is a village in Qeshlaq-e Sharqi Rural District, Qeshlaq Dasht District, Bileh Savar County, Ardabil Province, Iran. At the 2006 census, its population was 32, in 9 families.

References 

Towns and villages in Bileh Savar County